When Dawn Came is a 1920 American silent drama film directed by Colin Campbell and starring Lee Shumway, James O. Barrows, and Colleen Moore.

Cast

References

Bibliography
 Donald W. McCaffrey and Christopher P. Jacobs. Guide to the Silent Years of American Cinema. Greenwood Publishing, 1999.

External links

 

1920 films
1920 drama films
1920s English-language films
American silent feature films
Silent American drama films
American black-and-white films
Films directed by Colin Campbell
1920s American films